The 2005 season was Molde's 30th season in the top flight of Norwegian football. In Tippeligaen they finished 12th and played off against Moss to avoid relegation.

Molde won the Norwegian Cup. On 6 November they won the Cup Final against Lillestrøm. The final score was 4–2 after extra time.

Squad

As of end of season.

Competitions

Tippeligaen

Results summary

Results by round

Results

League table

Relegation play-offs

Norwegian Cup

Final

Squad statistics

Appearances and goals

|-
|colspan="14"|Players who left Molde during the season:

|}

Goal Scorers

See also
Molde FK seasons

References

External links
nifs.no

2005
Molde